The 1983 New York Yankees season was the 81st season for the Yankees. The team finished in third place in the American League Eastern Division with a record of 91-71, finishing 7 games behind the Baltimore Orioles. New York was managed by Billy Martin. The Yankees played their home games at Yankee Stadium.

Offseason 
 November 3, 1982: Bobby Ramos was purchased from the Yankees by the Montreal Expos.
 December 1, 1982: Don Baylor was signed as a free agent by the Yankees.
 December 9, 1982: Dave Collins, Mike Morgan, Fred McGriff and cash were traded by the Yankees to the Toronto Blue Jays for Dale Murray and Tom Dodd.
 December 14, 1982: Bobby Meacham was traded by the St. Louis Cardinals with Stan Javier to the New York Yankees for Steve Fincher (minors), Bob Helsom (minors) and Marty Mason (minors).
 December 22, 1982: Lee Mazzilli was traded by the New York Yankees to the Pittsburgh Pirates for Tim Burke, Don Aubin (minors), John Holland (minors), and Jose Rivera (minors).
 January 11, 1983: Ozzie Canseco was drafted by the Yankees in the 2nd round of the 1983 Major League Baseball draft.
 February 24, 1983: Bert Campaneris was signed as a free agent by the Yankees.
 February 28, 1983: Rowland Office was signed as a free agent by the Yankees.
 March 24, 1983: John Mayberry was released by the Yankees.

Spring training 
For the fourth straight spring training, the Yankees played an exhibition game at the Louisiana Superdome. On March 27, 1983, the Yankees beat the Toronto Blue Jays 2 to 1 behind six shutout innings from Doyle Alexander. Attendance was 15,129 for the game.

Regular season 
 June 11, 1983: Longtime Yankee Bobby Murcer played in the last game of his career.
 June 20, 1983: Bobby Murcer announced his retirement from the New York Yankees. On the same day, he became part of the Yankees Broadcasting Team for WPIX TV.
 July 4, 1983: Dave Righetti threw a no-hitter against the Boston Red Sox
 August 4, 1983: Dave Winfield, while warming up before the 5th inning of a game at Toronto's Exhibition Stadium, accidentally killed a seagull with a thrown ball. He doffed his cap in mock sorrow. Fans responded by hurling obscenities and improvised missiles. After the game, he was brought to the Ontario Provincial Police station on charges of cruelty to animals and was forced to post a $500 bond before being released. Quipped Yankees manager Billy Martin, "It's the first time he's hit the cutoff man." The charges were dropped the following day. For years afterward Winfield's appearances in Toronto were greeted with loud choruses of boos, but he later became a fan favorite.

Pine Tar Game 

The Pine Tar Game refers to a controversial incident that took place in an American League baseball game played between the Kansas City Royals and New York Yankees on July 24, 1983.

Playing at New York's Yankee Stadium, the Royals were trailing 4-3 with two outs in the top of the ninth and U L Washington on first base.  In the on deck circle, George Brett  was heard remarking to a teammate, "Watch this baby fly" as he shook his bat.  He then came to the plate and connected off Yankee reliever Rich "Goose" Gossage for a two-run home run and a 5-4 lead. As Brett crossed the plate, New York manager Billy Martin approached home plate umpire Tim McClelland and requested that Brett's bat be examined. Earlier in the season, Martin and other members (most notably, third baseman Graig Nettles, who as a member of the Minnesota Twins, recalled a similar incident involving Thurman Munson) of the Yankees had noticed the amount of pine tar used by Brett, but Martin had chosen not to say anything until the home run.

With Brett watching from the dugout, McClelland and the rest of the umpiring crew inspected the bat. Measuring the bat against the width of home plate (which is 17 inches), they determined that the amount of pine tar on the bat's handle exceeded that allowed by Rule 1.10(b) of the Major League Baseball rule book, which read that "a bat may not be covered by such a substance more than 18 inches from the tip of the handle."

Season standings

Record vs. opponents

Notable transactions 
 May 31, 1983: Doyle Alexander was released by the Yankees.
 June 6, 1983: University of Nebraska quarterback Turner Gill was selected by the Yankees in the 18th round of the 1983 Major League Baseball draft.
 June 9, 1983: Rick Reuschel was released by the Yankees.
 June 15, 1983: Ben Callahan, Marshall Brant and cash were traded by the Yankees to the Oakland Athletics for Matt Keough.
 June 17, 1983: Dave Wehrmeister was traded by the Yankees to the Philadelphia Phillies for Jim Rasmussen (minors) and Kelly Faulk (minors).
 July 22, 1983: Mike York was released by the Yankees.

Roster

Player stats

Batting

Starters by position 
Note: Pos = Position; G = Games played; AB = At bats; H = Hits; Avg. = Batting average; HR = Home runs; RBI = Runs batted in

Other batters 
Note: G = Games played; AB = At bats; H = Hits; Avg. = Batting average; HR = Home runs; RBI = Runs batted in

Pitching

Starting pitchers 
Note: G = Games pitched; IP = Innings pitched; W = Wins; L = Losses; ERA = Earned run average; SO = Strikeouts

Other pitchers 
Note: G = Games pitched; IP = Innings pitched; W = Wins; L = Losses; ERA = Earned run average; SO = Strikeouts

Relief pitchers 
Note: G = Games pitched; W = Wins; L = Losses; SV = Saves; ERA = Earned run average; SO = Strikeouts

Awards and honors 
Ron Guidry and Dave Winfield represented the Yankees at the 1983 Major League Baseball All-Star Game.

Gold Gloves were awarded to pitcher, Guidry and outfielder, Winfield.

Winfield also won the Silver Slugger Award.

Farm system

Notes

References 
1983 New York Yankees at Baseball Reference
1983 New York Yankees team page at www.baseball-almanac.com

New York Yankees seasons
New York Yankees
New York Yankees
1980s in the Bronx